James Garrett Thimmes (October 4, 1896 – January 16, 1955) was an American labor unionist.

Born in Hemlock, Ohio, Thimmes left school at the age of 15 and worked in a pottery, and then from 1911 in steel mills in Youngstown, Ohio.  During World War I, he served in the United States Army.  After the war, he moved to Chicago, where he joined the Amalgamated Association of Iron, Steel and Tin Workers.

In 1924, Thimmes became president of his union lodge, and in 1936 he wrote the successful resolution proposing that the union's leadership to work with the Congress of Industrial Organizations (CIO) to establish the Steel Workers' Organizing Committee (SWOC).  Thimmes began working full-time for the SWOC, initially in Chicago, and then in California.  In 1940, he was appointed as director of the new United Steel Workers of America's (USWA) District 38, covering California, and also as president of the California Industrial Union Council.  In this role, he opposed communist involvement in the union movement.

During World War II, Thimmes served on the California War Manpower Commission and Re-employment Commission.  In 1946, he was elected as the vice-president of the USWA, and he was later also elected as a vice-president of the CIO.  He died in 1955, still in office.

References

1896 births
1955 deaths
American trade unionists
People from Perry County, Ohio
Trade unionists from Ohio
United Steelworkers people